The  Blackwater Bossing Red President is a Philippine 3x3 basketball team which competes in the PBA 3x3, organized by the Philippines' top-flight professional league, Philippine Basketball Association (PBA). The team is affiliated with the PBA member franchise team Blackwater Bossing.

History
Blackwater Bossing did not field a team in the inaugural 2021 PBA 3x3 season despite being one of the twelve regular franchise teams of the main 5x5 PBA league. This is due to cost-cutting measures of Blackwater's parent company Ever Bilena which was significantly impacted by the COVID-19 pandemic. Blackwater announced intention to join in for the third conference in May 2022 but ultimately did not took part. The team is set to join the PBA 3x3 in the 2022–23 season.

Current roster

References

PBA 3x3 teams
2022 establishments in the Philippines
Basketball teams established in 2022